The Strabomantidae are a family of frogs native to South America. These frogs lack a free-living larval stage and hatch directly into miniature "froglets". This family includes Pristimantis, the most speciose genus of any vertebrate.

Systematics
The following subfamilies and genera are in the family Strabomantidae.

Holoadeninae
Bahius Dubois, Ohler, and Pyron, 2021
Barycholos Heyer, 1969
Bryophryne Hedges, Duellman, and Heinicke, 2008
Euparkerella Griffiths, 1959
Holoaden Miranda-Ribeiro, 1920
Microkayla De la Riva, Chaparro, Castroviejo-Fisher, and Padial, 2017
Noblella Barbour, 1930
Psychrophrynella Hedges, Duellman, and Heinicke, 2008
Qosqophryne Catenazzi, Mamani, Lehr, and von May, 2020

Hypodactylinae
Niceforonia Goin and Cochran, 1963

Pristimantinae
Lynchius Hedges, Duellman, and Heinicke, 2008
Oreobates Jiménez de la Espada, 1872
Phrynopus Peters, 1873
Pristimantis Jiménez de la Espada, 1870
Serranobatrachus Arroyo, Targino, Rueda-Solano, Daza-R., and Grant, 2022
Tachiramantis Heinicke, Barrio-Amorós, and Hedges, 2015
Yunganastes Padial, Castroviejo-Fisher, Köhler, Domic, and De la Riva, 2007

Strabomantinae
Strabomantis Peters, 1863

References

External links

 
Amphibian families